The Nike Sport Research Lab is a research and development institute located in Beaverton in the U.S. state of Oregon. Opened in 1980, the lab is owned by American apparel and footwear maker Nike. Commercials for the facility have featured famous NBA and PGA athletes talking positively about the products and the research behind them.

Details
The first Nike lab opened in 1980 in Exeter, New Hampshire. The  Sport Research Lab is located in the Mia Hamm building at the company's headquarters in Beaverton, Oregon. They deal with creating new footwear from athletic endeavors like track and field, golf, and basketball. Equipment at the lab include a mannequin constructed of copper, motion capture rooms, and environmental chambers, among others. The lab's facilities are also known as "the Kitchen" and "the Oven" (for most of their professional golf equipment). Nike Golf operates The Oven in Fort Worth, Texas, for developing golf clubs, while The Oven West in Oregon develops balls.

The company has also been researching the Spark Suit. While production was expected to be completed in 2012, the fate of the Spark Suit is currently unknown. The suit is essentially a wearable generator based on nanotechnology. The concept of the Spark Suit is to convert the movements of the wearer into electricity using nano-ion pumps. This technology has a possible application in a hypothetical vehicle called the Nike ONE.  Due to the extra resistance caused by the electrical generator, the Spark Suit can be used to strategically impede movement. It therefore might allow people to strategically build muscle mass and improve coordination, as well as a weight loss tool. Massotherapists are also employed within the facility.

References

External links
 

Buildings and structures in Beaverton, Oregon
Laboratories in Oregon
Nike, Inc.
Research institutes in Oregon
1980 establishments in Oregon